The South Jackson Mountains Wilderness is a U.S. Wilderness Area in Nevada under the Bureau of Land Management. It is located in the Jackson Mountains, south of the North Jackson Mountains Wilderness and east of the Black Rock Desert Wilderness.

See also 
Black Rock Desert-High Rock Canyon Emigrant Trails National Conservation Area

References

External links 
South Jackson Mountains Wilderness - Wilderness Connect

Wilderness areas of Nevada
Protected areas of Humboldt County, Nevada
IUCN Category Ib
Bureau of Land Management areas in Nevada